Giulia Nanni (born 14 April 1997) is an Italian professional racing cyclist who rides for Bepink.

See also
 List of 2016 UCI Women's Teams and riders

References

External links
 

1997 births
Living people
Italian female cyclists
Place of birth missing (living people)